Heavy Metal 2000 (also known as Heavy Metal: F.A.K.K.² outside North America) is a 2000 Canadian adult animated science fiction film produced by Jacques Pettigrew and Michel Lemire, and directed by Michael Coldewey and Lemire. Starring the voices of Michael Ironside, Julie Strain, and Billy Idol, the film is the follow-up to the 1981 animated cult film Heavy Metal, which is based on the fantasy magazine of the same name. The story is based on the graphic novel, The Melting Pot, written by Kevin Eastman, Simon Bisley and Eric Talbot. The film was made by CinéGroupe, a studio based in Montreal, Quebec.

Plot
In ages past, the Arakacians, a malevolent race, discovered a place where space-time leaked a type of fluid. This fluid granted immortality to anyone who consumed it. The Arakacians built an empire and enslaved the known universe for centuries. They were finally vanquished after the fountain chamber (where they gathered the water of life) was sealed by freedom fighters. The key to the chamber, a glowing crystal that can lead the bearer back to the fountain and drives anyone who possessed it insane, was cast into space and lost among the stars.

In a present-day asteroid excavation, space crewman Tyler and his colleague find the key by accident. Tyler touches the key and instantly goes insane. He kills his mining partner and takes over the ship, killing everyone but Dr. Schechter, and the pilots Lambert and Germain. His search for the planet with the fountain leads to Eden, a planet that is designated F.A.K.K.² (Federation-Assigned Ketogenic Killzone to the second level), but has inhabitants whose bodies carry the immortality fluid. Tyler invades Eden, and kills many of the Edenites, capturing some so he can extract the immortality fluids from their bodies. He also keeps the attractive Kerrie for his own sexual purposes. When Germain resists the idea, he is left on Eden.

Kerrie's sister Julie survives the attack and teams up with Germain to follow Tyler. At a renegade space station, Julie finds Tyler and critically injures him. However, he ingests a vial with the immortality serum and heals instantly. In the ensuing gunfight, Tyler blows up the club. Escaping the explosion, Julie and Germain board a shuttlecraft that latches onto Tyler's ship before it jumps into hyperspace. Discovering them mid-travel, Tyler tries to shake them off, but the fight causes the two ships to crash.

Julie wakes up on Oroboris, a desert planet, and meets Odin, a mysterious cloaked sage, and his assistant, Zeek, a rock-like creature. The two are guardians of the ancient fountain. With his ship destroyed and most of his crew dead, Tyler orders Dr. Schechter to extract Kerrie's fluids. While exploring the planet, he finds a race of reptilian beings and conquers them by defeating their champion and their leader in a death match. Julie enters the reptilian city in disguise as a woman that the reptiles found for Tyler. That night, she seduces Tyler and tries to kill him, but Zeek stops the attempt and captures her, taking her back to Odin. Julie then infiltrates Tyler's ship and discovers Kerrie is still alive. She takes out Dr. Schechter, frees Kerrie, and escapes as the complex explodes. Tyler, with only three vials of serum left, orders his troops to storm the citadel where the immortality fountain is located.

At the citadel, Julie undergoes a ritual where armor is bestowed upon her. She, Kerrie, and Germain help the fountain's guardians defend against Tyler's army. In the fighting, Lambert suffers a near-fatal injury and knocks Tyler's last vial of immortality serum loose, breaking it on the ground. Tyler, enraged, kills Lambert for the blunder and walks to the pit of immortality. He is about to put the crystal into the fountain's final lock but is stopped by Julie, who stabs him in the left eye. A fight ensues in which, with Odin's help, Julie finally kills Tyler. Odin then throws off his cloak, revealing himself to be the last of the Arakacians. He has been in hiding all these centuries, waiting for someone to find the chamber key and be drawn to the fountain. He intends to claim it as his own and reestablish the Arakacian empire. However, Zeek pulls the crystal key from the pedestal, locking Odin inside the fountain chamber forever, and flies into outer space. As Germain and Kerrie help Julie to her feet, Zeek envelops the crystal into himself and becomes a new asteroid to hide the key for all time.

Cast
 Julie Strain as Julie; the on-screen character was also based on Strain's likeness
 Michael Ironside as Tyler
 Billy Idol as Odin
 Pierre Kohn as Germain St. Germain
 Sonja Ball as Kerrie
 Brady Moffatt as Lambert
 Rick Jones as Zeek
 Arthur Holden as Dr. Schechter

Reception
Heavy Metal 2000 was panned by critics. On review aggregator website Rotten Tomatoes, the film holds a 17% rating based on reviews from 12 critics.

Home media release

The movie was released on DVD and video on July 10, 2000.

Video game

The film had a video game about the events after Heavy Metal 2000, titled Heavy Metal: F.A.K.K. 2, in which the player assumes the role of Julie as she fights to save Eden from an evil entity called "GITH". The game is set some time after the film and features cameo appearances of several characters, for example, Julie's sister Kerrie, the pilot Germaine (now married to Kerrie), and a resurrected Tyler.

Possible sequel
After the release of 2000, a third film has been in various stages of development since then. During 2008 and into 2009, reports circulated that David Fincher and James Cameron would executive produce, and each direct one of the eight to nine segments for a new film based on Heavy Metal. Eastman would also direct a segment, as well as animator Tim Miller, with Zack Snyder, Gore Verbinski, and Guillermo del Toro attached to direct segments. However, Paramount Pictures decided to stop funding the film by August 2009 and no distributor or production company has shown interest in the second sequel since.  Fincher and Miller subsequently developed their plans into Love, Death & Robots, an original animated series for Netflix initially released in 2019.

In 2011, filmmaker Robert Rodriguez announced at Comic-Con that he had purchased the film rights to Heavy Metal and planned to develop a new animated film at the new Quick Draw Studios. However, on March 11, 2014, with the formation of his very own television network, El Rey, Rodriguez considered switching gears and bringing it to TV.

Soundtrack

The Heavy Metal 2000 Original Soundtrack is the 2000 soundtrack album to the film of the same name. In his AllMusic review, Greg Prato said that the album was a "truer heavy metal soundtrack" than that of the first film, featuring a combination of established bands such as Pantera, Monster Magnet, and Machine Head; then-newer bands such as Queens of the Stone Age, System of a Down, Hate Dept., Puya, and Coal Chamber; and a few non-metal artists such as Billy Idol, Insane Clown Posse, Twiztid, and Bauhaus. The vast majority of the tracks were either specifically recorded for the soundtrack or were previously unreleased up to that point. One month after its release in the U.S., the soundtrack peaked at No. 101 on the Billboard 200 chart.

 "F.A.K.K. U" — 1:44
 "Silver Future" by Monster Magnet — 4:29
 "Missing Time" by MDFMK — 4:35
 "Immortally Insane" by Pantera — 5:11
 "Inside the Pervert Mound" by Zilch — 4:07
 "The Dirt Ball" by Insane Clown Posse and Twiztid — 5:33
 "Störagéd" by System of a Down — 1:17
 "Rough Day" by Days of the New — 3:18
 "Psychosexy" by Sinisstar — 4:02
 "Infinity" by Queens of the Stone Age — 4:40
 "Alcoholocaust" by Machine Head — 3:38
 "Green Iron Fist" by Full Devil Jacket — 3:51
 "Hit Back" by Hate Dept. — 3:52
 "Tirale" by Puya — 5:34
 "Dystopia" by Apartment 26 — 2:56
 "Buried Alive" by Billy Idol — 5:10
 "Wishes" by Coal Chamber — 3:06
 "The Dog's a Vapour" by Bauhaus — 6:44

Additional tracks:

(These were used in the film, but were not included in the official soundtrack for unknown reasons.)

 "Apparition" by Coal Chamber — 2:28
 "Hate Me" by Sons of Domination — 2:24
 "Ion" by Voivod — 4:32
 "You Don't Know What It's Like" by Econoline Crush — 4:02

References

External links
 
 
 

Heavy Metal (magazine) films
2000 direct-to-video films
2000 animated films
2000s action adventure films
2000s fantasy adventure films
2000 science fiction action films
Canadian direct-to-video films
Canadian action adventure films
Canadian science fiction adventure films
Canadian animated science fiction films
Canadian animated fantasy films
Canadian animated feature films
German animated science fiction films
German science fiction action films
German fantasy adventure films
German animated fantasy films
Direct-to-video sequel films
American fantasy adventure films
American science fiction action films
American space adventure films
American direct-to-video films
Sony Pictures direct-to-video films
Animated films based on comics
Animated films about extraterrestrial life
Canadian adult animated films
Films set on fictional planets
2000 films
2000s English-language films
2000s American films
2000s Canadian films
2000s German films